The Australian Master of the Amateurs is an amateur golf tournament. It is a four-day 72-hole stroke play event held in early January. The men's event started in 1997 with the women's event added in 2018.

The event was originally called the Master of the Amateurs and was held in Queensland from its founding in 1997 until 2000. After missing a year in 2001 the event relocated to Melbourne, Victoria. It has been held at Yarra Yarra, Royal Melbourne and Victoria. Southern Golf Club hosted the event for the first time in 2023.

Winners

Men

The event was held over 36 holes in 1997 and 1998 and over 54 holes in 1999.

Source:

Women

Source:

References

External links
Official site
Golf Australia web site

Amateur golf tournaments in Australia